Croatotrechus tvrtkovici is a species of beetle in the family Carabidae, the only species in the genus Croatotrechus.

References

Trechinae
Beetles described in 1999